Metipocregyes is a genus of longhorn beetles of the subfamily Lamiinae, containing the following species:

 Metipocregyes affinis Breuning, 1968
 Metipocregyes nodieri (Pic, 1933)
 Metipocregyes rondoni Breuning, 1965

References

Mesosini